PSMB8 antisense RNA 1 (head to head) is a protein that in humans is encoded by the PSMB8-AS1 gene.

References

Further reading